Shimanto is the name of several places in Japan.

Shimanto, Kōchi (city) (四万十市), a city in Kōchi Prefecture
Shimanto, Kōchi (town) (四万十町), a town in Kōchi Prefecture
Shimanto River, in Kōchi Prefecture

Shimanto may also mean:
Shimanto (train), a train service in Japan
3182 Shimanto, an asteroid
Shimanto Square, shopping mall in Dhaka, Bangladesh